Section 8 is the fourth studio album by American rapper MC Eiht, and his second solo album outside the Compton's Most Wanted brand. It was released on June 8, 1999 through Hoo-Bangin'/Priority Records. Production was handled by several record producers, including Ant Banks, DJ Slip, Fredwreck, Julio G and MC Eiht himself, with Hoo-Bangin' Records founder Mack 10 serving as executive producer. It features guest performances from Ice Cube, High "T", Mack 10, Soultre, Techniec, Val Young and CMW.

The album peaked at number 54 on the Billboard 200 and at number 5 on the Top R&B/Hip-Hop Albums chart in the United States. Its lead single, "Automatic", made it to number 62 on the Hot R&B/Hip-Hop Songs and number 6 on the Hot Rap Songs.

Along with a single, a music video was produced for "Automatic". The song "Thicker Than Water" was originally heard in Richard Cummings Jr.'s 1999 film Thicker than Water and was also released as a single and a music video to promote the film's soundtrack.

Track listing

Samples
Dayz of 89'
"You Are My Starship" by Norman Connors
Flatline
"Sweet Moments" by The Love Unlimited Orchestra
Me & My Bitch
"Rain Dance" by The Jeff Lorber Fusion
My Life
"Everybody Loves the Sunshine" by Roy Ayers
"Everyday" by Jamiroquai
"In the Mood" by Tyrone Davis
Thicker Than Water
"If You Play Your Cards Right" by Alicia Myers

Chart history

References

External links 

1999 albums
MC Eiht albums
Priority Records albums
Albums produced by MC Eiht
Albums produced by Ant Banks
Albums produced by Fredwreck